Why Me or Why Me? may refer to:

Music
 "Why Me" (Kris Kristofferson song), 1973
 "Why Me" (Styx song), 1979
 "Why Me?" (Irene Cara song), 1983
 "Why Me?" (Linda Martin song), 1992
 "Why Me" (PJ & Duncan song), 1994
 "Why Me?" (Kierra Sheard song), 2006
 "Why Me?" (Ice Cube song), 2008
 "Why Me", a 1983 song by Planet P Project
 "Why Me?", a 1988 song by Mike + The Mechanics from the album Living Years
 "Why Me?", a 1994 song by A House
 Why Me? (album), a 2000 live album by Daniel Johnston

Film and television
 Why Me? (1978 film), a 1978 animated short film by Janet Perlman
 Why Me? (1984 film), a TV film directed by Fielder Cook starring Glynnis O'Connor and Armand Assante
 Why Me? (1985 film), a Hong Kong film directed by Kent Cheng
 Why Me? (1990 film), a film directed by Gene Quintano
 Why Me? (2015 film), a Romanian film

See also
"Why Me?" an article written by Jodie Foster for Esquire, published on the December 1982 issue
 Who Me (disambiguation)